YRO can refer to
 Ottawa/Rockcliffe Airport, the IATA airport code
 A Slashdot sub-section on politics, Your Rights Online
 Y.R.O., a song by Racer X on their 1986 album Street Lethal